Ganjia Township (Mandarin: 甘加乡) is a township in Xiahe County, Gannan Tibetan Autonomous Prefecture, Gansu, China. In 2010, Ganjia Township had a total population of 7,334: 3,617 males and 3,717 females: 1,619 aged under 14, 5,219 aged between 15 and 65 and 496 aged over 65.

References 

Xiahe County